Hailey Baptiste (born November 3, 2001) is an American professional tennis player.

Career
On the junior tour, she reached a career-high ranking of No. 38 on January 29, 2018. She ended runner-up at the US Open junior doubles' tournament in 2018.

Baptiste made her WTA Tour main-draw debut at the 2019 Washington Open, beating Grand Slam finalist and former top-ten player Madison Keys in the first round. She has won three singles titles on the ITF Women's Circuit.

Baptiste made her World TeamTennis debut in 2020 with the Vegas Rollers as an alternate, later ending up on the roster for the New York Empire in the 2020 season at The Greenbrier.

On 7 March 2022, she reached her best singles ranking of world No. 119.

Performance timelines

Only main-draw results in WTA Tour, Grand Slam tournaments, Fed Cup/Billie Jean King Cup and Olympic Games are included in win–loss records.

Singles
Current after the 2023 Australian Open.

Doubles

WTA career finals

Doubles: 1 (1 title)

ITF Circuit finals

Singles: 3 (3 titles)

Doubles: 5 (2 title, 3 runner-ups)

Junior Grand Slam finals

Doubles: 1 (runner-up)

Notes

References

External links
 
 

Living people
2001 births
African-American female tennis players
American female tennis players
Tennis players from Washington, D.C.
21st-century African-American sportspeople
21st-century African-American women